Grace Episcopal Church is a historic church in Clayton, Alabama.  It was placed on the Alabama Register of Landmarks and Heritage on January 29, 1980, and the National Register of Historic Places on September 22, 1995.

This church had its origins in a mission station established by the Reverend J. L. Gay in 1844.

On May 10, 1872, the mission was formally accepted in the Diocese of Alabama as Grace Church. Construction of a church building began in 1875 on a lot owned by General Henry DeLamar Clayton and his wife Victoria. The Gothic Revival style building was completed on February 26, 1876 at which time the lot was deeded by the Claytons to the Protestant Episcopal Church of the State of Alabama. Bishop Richard J. Wilmer formally consecrated the church on November 14, 1876.

The mission and church were served by Thomas J. Bland, DeBerniere Waddell, and E. W. Spalding as well as other clergy.

See also
National Register of Historic Places listings in Barbour County, Alabama

References

External links
Historic Chattahoochee Commission

National Register of Historic Places in Barbour County, Alabama
Churches on the National Register of Historic Places in Alabama
Episcopal church buildings in Alabama
Properties on the Alabama Register of Landmarks and Heritage
Carpenter Gothic church buildings in Alabama